The Espinharas River is a river of Paraíba and Rio Grande do Norte states in western Brazil.

See also
List of rivers of Paraíba
List of rivers of Rio Grande do Norte

References
Brazilian Ministry of Transport

Rivers of Paraíba
Rivers of Rio Grande do Norte